Rovalpituzumab tesirine (Rova-T) is an experimental antibody-drug conjugate targeting the protein DLL3 on tumor cells. It was originally developed by Stemcentrx and was purchased by AbbVie. It was tested for use in small-cell lung cancer, but development was terminated after unsuccessful phase III trial.

Development
In 2018, an Independent Data Monitoring Committee found that in the TAHOE phase III trial, Rova-T shortened survival of lung cancer patients compared to SOC chemotherapy topotecan, prompting termination of trial enrollment. Another phase III trial (MERU) demonstrated no survival benefit over placebo. A phase II trial using the drug as a third-line treatment for relapsed or refractory lung cancer showed objective response rate at just 16%.

Chemical structure

Chemical structure of "tesirine" (drawn in black). It consists of a pyrrolobenzodiazepine type dimer (top), which is the actual anti-cancer agent, a Val–Ala structure that can be cleaved by an enzyme to detach the anti-cancer agent from the antibody, a polyethylene glycol spacer, and a maleimide linker which is attached to a cysteine in the antibody's (rovalpituzumab's) peptide backbone, drawn blue. Each rovalpituzumab molecule has an average of two such attachments.

See also
 Vadastuximab talirine, with a similar cytotoxin

References

Experimental cancer drugs
Antibody-drug conjugates
Orphan drugs
Monoclonal antibodies for tumors